Robert Branks 'Bobby' Powell (11 April 1881 – 28 April 1917) was a male tennis player from Canada.

Biography
In 1904 Powell was the founder of the North Pacific International Lawn Tennis Association. He won several singles titles including the 1901 Western Canadian and Pacific Northwest in Tacoma, the 1903 British Columbia tournament and the 1904 Oregon State title 1904.

From 1900 to 1904 he was the private secretary to the Lieutenant Governor of British Columbia Henri-Gustave Joly de Lotbinière.

Powell reached the semifinal of the 1908 Wimbledon Championships in which he lost to the eventual champion Arthur Gore in straight sets. In 1909 he won the All England Plate at Wimbledon, a competition and prize introduced for players who had lost in the first or second round of the singles. In July 1908 Powell won the singles and doubles title of the Scottish Championships.

He participated in the 1908 Summer Olympics in London, where he captained Canada's tennis delegation and placed joint-ninth in the singles tournament and, alongside compatriot James Foulkes, joint-seventh in the doubles competition.

At the 1910 Wimbledon Championships he reached the All-Comers final of the men's doubles competition partnering Kenneth Powell. They lost in three straight sets to eventual champions Major Ritchie and Anthony Wilding.

In July 1910 Powell competed in the Surrey Championships, reaching the final in which he was defeated in fours sets by Major Ritchie.

In 1913 and 1914 he played in four ties for the Canadian Davis Cup team. The best team result was reaching the Challenge Round in the 1913 against the USA at Wimbledon. To date this is still the best performance of a Canadian Davis Cup team and the team has been inducted into the Greater Victoria Sports Hall of Fame in 2008. Powell had a Davis Cup match record of 4 wins vs. 5 losses.

Tennis author and journalist A. Wallis Myers described Powell in his book Twenty Years of Lawn Tennis as "A sound player, using a left arm and a resourceful brain to deceive his opponent, one of the best lobbers I have ever known, an intrepid poacher and a fast sprinter..".

Powell enlisted in the Forty-Eighth Canadian Battalion of the Canadian Infantry in World War I and reached the rank of Lieutenant. He was killed in action in France during the Battle of Vimy Ridge on 28 April 1917.

In 1993 he was inducted into the Canadian Tennis Hall of fame followed in 2000 by his induction into the USTA Pacific Northwest Hall of Fame. Powell was later inducted into the Canada's Sports Hall of Fame in 2015.

See also
 List of Olympians killed in World War I

References

External links
 
 
 Canadian Tennis Hall of Fame – Player Profile

1881 births
1917 deaths
Canadian male tennis players
Olympic tennis players of Canada
Tennis players at the 1908 Summer Olympics
Canadian military personnel killed in World War I
Sportspeople from Victoria, British Columbia
Canadian Expeditionary Force officers
Canadian military personnel from British Columbia
Racket sportspeople from British Columbia